Airdrie was a provincial electoral district in Alberta, Canada, mandated to return a single member to the Legislative Assembly of Alberta using the first-past-the-post method of voting from 2012 to 2019.

History
The electoral district was created in the 2010 Alberta boundary re-distribution primarily from the abolished Airdrie-Chestermere electoral district, with a small portion west of the City of Airdrie from the abolished Foothills-Rocky View electoral district.

The Airdrie electoral district was dissolved in the 2017 electoral boundary re-distribution, and portions of the district would form the newly created Airdrie-Cochrane and Airdrie-East electoral districts.

Boundary history

Electoral history

The electoral district was created in 2010. Incumbent Airdrie-Chestermere MLA Rob Anderson, who had been elected as a PC in 2008 but crossed the floor to Wildrose, was elected in Airdrie under the Wildrose banner in 2012. However, he subsequently crossed the floor back to the PCs.

Wildrose would re-gain the seat in 2015, sending Angela Pitt to the Legislative Assembly. Amongst the candidates Pitt defeated was PC candidate and Mayor of Airdrie Peter Brown. She would also cross the floor, joining the new United Conservative Party when the PCs and Wildrose decided to merge in 2017.

The riding was abolished when the 29th Legislature expired. Therefore, Airdrie has twice elected Wildrose MLAs, but neither served their full term with the party.

Legislature results

2012 general election

2015 general election

Senate nominee results

2012 Senate nominee election district results

Student vote results

2012 election

See also
List of Alberta provincial electoral districts

References

External links
Elections Alberta
The Legislative Assembly of Alberta

Former provincial electoral districts of Alberta
Airdrie, Alberta